Sarkara-Chirayinkeezhu  is a village in Thiruvananthapuram district in the state of Kerala, India.

Demographics
 India census, Sarkara-Chirayinkeezhu had a population of 30502 with 14135 males and 16367 females.

References

Famous Malayalam cine actress Prem Nazir, Bharath Gopi born here.

Villages in Thiruvananthapuram district